WYXR (91.7 FM) is an eclectic, non-profit community radio station headquartered in the historic Crosstown Concourse building in Memphis, Tennessee, United States. The station is owned by Crosstown Radio Partnership, Inc. and is a collaboration between Crosstown Concourse, the Daily Memphian and the University of Memphis.

The WYXR air room is located in the Central Atrium of Crosstown Concourse, where passersby can view inside the studio as shows are broadcast live. It officially started broadcasting on Monday, October 5, 2020.

History
WYXR Sign On in 1974 as WSWM. The former call letters of WUMR were used up until 2020.  In march of 2022,  WISX 106.1 FM in Philly has the call letters of WUMR.

Programming

The programming is a mix of music, news, talk, arts, and culture with a focus on the Memphis area and features more than 90 volunteer disc jockeys, along with syndicated programs from the KUDZUKIAN Network, Beale Street Caravan and Thacker Mountain Radio.

The mission of WYXR, according to its licensee, is to provide a musical, cultural and artistic platform that represents and informs the people of Memphis. It streams live and archives shows on its website.

History
The station originally started with the call letters WUMR and was managed by the University of Memphis staff/faculty members of the CCFA, with most air shifts staffed by broadcasting students. For most of its history, it ran a broad jazz format, with some specialty programs during the week.

The University of Memphis transferred WUMR's license to Crosstown Radio Partnership, Inc. effective March 31, 2020, and the station's call sign was changed to WYXR.

Operations

The staff of WYXR includes executive director Robby Grant (of the group Big Ass Truck), program manager Jared “Jay B” Boyd, development manager Kate Teague and coordinator of operations Shelby McCall.

Notable Disc Jockeys

Robert Gordon
Andrew VanWyngarden
Pat Sansone
Greg Cartwright
Zac Ives (Goner Records)
DJ Spanish Fly
DJ Kvng
DJ Chris Cross
DJ 2 Keys
Jazzy Lo
That Boy Cortez
DJ Ben Murray
DJ Alpha Whiskey
Jack Cooper (WUMR)

References

External links
 
 

YXR
YXR
YXR
University of Memphis
Radio stations established in 1974
1974 establishments in Tennessee